The Metrebus Card is a contactless smartcard ticketing system for Rome. It has stored value on a paper ticket for either 1, 3 or 7 days. All three versions of the tickets look the same on the front, but on the back of the ticket the magnetic data printed on the ticket varies depending on which version of the ticket was purchased.

There is also a single ticket, which sells for only €1.50, allowing travel on any bus and one trip on the metro or urban trains. This version of the ticket has a 100-minute expiry period.

In 2011, a new VISA style smart card was implemented, with a much sturdier design and longer lifespan.

Release
After the contract was awarded to the ERG Motorola Alliance in 1999, the card system was rolled out across Rome, with the system becoming fully operational in 2001.

In 2009 in Anagnina, car parking with Metrebus was introduced, which involved swiping the card at entry and exit to the car park, with validators stationed there. This has allowed improved traffic fluidity. There have been plans to extend this trial, with Montebello also set to receive this feature, which would again help the car park when all 354 spaces are occupied.

In April 2013, ATM top up for the Red Metrebus Card was implemented with its migration from contactless magnetic card to contactless smartcard. These cards can be reloaded by visiting any UniCredit ATM and entering the card number.

In June 2018, the Red Metrebus Card was replaced by a new one, which allowed Pay&Go in car parks and to reload it and purchase transport titles in PARC meters as well as with an NFC smartphone.

Purchase
Red Metrebus Cards can be purchased at ATAC ticket offices at the following stations: Anagnina, Battistini, Cornelia, Lepanto, Ottaviano S. Pietro, Laurentina, EUR Fermi, Ponte Mammolo, Termini, and Conca d’Oro.

References